Then Sings My Soul is a 2009 inspirational double CD album recorded by country music singer Ronnie Milsap. To date, it is his first and only gospel recording ever. It features several traditional hymns along with Christian-altered hit singles, including Milsap's "What a Difference You've Made in My Life" and Ben E. King's "Stand by Me". It was being marketed by an extensive TV mail order campaign.

Track listing

Disc one
 "I'll Fly Away" (Albert E. Brumley)
 "How Great Thou Art" (Stuart K. Hine)
 "Soon and Very Soon"
 "Farther Along" (Jesse Randall Baxter)
 "Amazing Grace" (Traditional)
 "Stand by Me" (Ben E. King, Jerry Leiber, Mike Stoller)
 "Up to Zion" (Noreen Crayton, Greg Tomquist)
 "World of Wonder" (James Darrell Scott)
 "In the Garden" (Traditional)
 "Just a Closer Walk with Thee" (Traditional)
 "Peace in the Valley" (Rev. Thomas A. Dorsey)
 "Have Thine Own Way" (Traditional)

Disc two
 "Swing Down Chariot"
 "Precious Memories"
 "Rock of Ages" (Traditional)
 "People Get Ready"
 "Softly and Tenderly" (Traditional)
 "What a Friend We Have in Jesus" (Traditional)
 "What a Difference You've Made in My Life"
 "Jesus Was All I Had" (Donnie Fritts)
 "It is No Secret" (Stuart Hamblen)
 "The Old Rugged Cross" (Traditional)
 "Holy, Holy, Holy" (Traditional)
 "The Lord's Prayer" (Albert Hay Malotte)

Personnel
Jamie Brantley - acoustic guitar, electric guitar
Mark Casstevens - acoustic guitar
Noreen Crayton - background vocals 
Bruce Dees - background vocals
Kevin Durham - background vocals
Steve Gibson - electric guitar
Jon Mark Ivey - background vocals
Shane Keister - Fender Rhodes, organ, synthesizer
Catherine Styron Marx - Fender Rhodes, piano
Kerry Marx - acoustic guitar
Ronnie Milsap - Fender Rhodes, lead vocals
Louis Dean Nunley - background vocals
Larry Paxton - bass guitar
Lisa Silver - background vocals
Kira Small - background vocals
Russell Terrell - background vocals
Bergen White - background vocals
Lonnie Wilson - drums

Chart performance
The album peaked at #19 on the Billboard Top Country Albums chart, #8 on the Billboard Top Christian Albums chart, and #127 on the Billboard 200.

Awards

In 2010, the album was nominated for a Dove Award for Country Album of the Year at the 41st GMA Dove Awards.

References

2009 albums
Ronnie Milsap albums